"Tossing and Turning" is a song written by John Carter, Ken Lewis and Perry Ford and performed by the Ivy League. Released as a single in 1965, it reached number 3 on the UK Singles Chart, staying there for 13 weeks. It was the group's biggest hit. It was also the group's only hit in the US, charting at number 83 on the Billboard Hot 100.

References

1965 songs
1965 singles
English pop songs
Piccadilly Records singles
Songs written by John Carter (musician)
Songs written by Ken Lewis (songwriter)
The Ivy League (band) songs